Most Reverend Sir Peter Kurongku, KBE (1930 – 11 June 1996) was Roman Catholic Archbishop of Port Moresby, Papua New Guinea.

Born in 1930 at Tonnui, he was ordained a priest of Bougainville, Papua New Guinea on 21 December 1966 by Archbishop Daniel Stuyvenberg. On 15 November 1978 he was named Auxiliary Bishop of Honiara, Solomon Islands and as Titular Bishop of Sinnuara on 25 March 1979. On 3 October 1981, he was appointed as Archbishop of Port Moresby and installed the following month.

He was created a Knight Commander of the Most Excellent Order of the British Empire "for public and community services", dated 14 June 1986. He died on 11 June 1996. He had been a priest for 29 years and a bishop for 17 years.

External links
Catholic Hierarchy

1930 births
1996 deaths
Knights Commander of the Order of the British Empire
People from the Autonomous Region of Bougainville
People from the National Capital District (Papua New Guinea)
20th-century Roman Catholic archbishops in Papua New Guinea
Date of birth unknown
Roman Catholic archbishops of Port Moresby
Papua New Guinean Roman Catholic archbishops